Ripgut brome or ripgut grass refers to some species of brome grasses (Bromus):

 Bromus diandrus (great brome)
 Bromus rigidus (stiff brome)

The name refers to the fact that even for brome grasses, these species are heavily sclerotized and can cause harm to livestock that feed on them.

Bromus